The 2024 Democratic National Convention is an upcoming event in which delegates of the United States Democratic Party will choose the party's nominees for president and vice president for the 2024 United States presidential election.

Site selection

Early developments
Amid the downsizing of the 2020 Democratic National Convention held in various parts of the United States, including its main host city of Milwaukee, Wisconsin, on a virtual format impacted due to the COVID-19 pandemic, there was talk by a number of notable individuals in Milwaukee about the city pushing to receive the 2024 convention as consolation. Speculation exists that, due to the circumstances surrounding the downsizing of the 2020 convention, Milwaukee would be a front-runner to host the convention if it pursues it. Milwaukee Mayor Tom Barrett has been open to the city hosting either a Democratic or Republican convention in 2024. If awarded the 2024 convention, Milwaukee could become the first city to host major party conventions in consecutive elections since New York City held both the 1976 and 1980 Democratic conventions.

In March 2021, chairman of the Democratic National Committee Jaime Harrison, when asked about the possibility of Milwaukee hosting the 2024 convention in an interview with Milwaukee-based Fox television station WITI, answered, 

In the summer of 2021, Jaime Harrison sent letters to over twenty cities inviting them to bid to host the convention.

Officials in Columbus, Ohio have, since at least 2019, discussed trying to seek either the Democratic or Republican convention in 2024. Milwaukee has been discussed ever since the downsizing of the 2020 convention held in the city and it is expecting to revert to the usual standard full-scale format like spectators and broadcasters being shown from electronic billboards at the host city's arena since the 2016 convention.

After being one of approximately twenty cities that Democratic National Committee Chair Jaime Harrison invited to bid, Milwaukee Mayor Barrett wrote Harrison a letter indicating the city's interest in hosting the party's 2024 convention. Milwaukee is also bidding to host the 2024 Republican National Convention.

Nashville, Tennessee had taken action to pursue the Democratic Convention. Nashville is also bidding to host the Republican National Convention.

Top Democrats from Illinois, including Governor J. B. Pritzker, Senator Tammy Duckworth, and Mayor Lori Lightfoot, have laid the groundwork to host the Convention in Chicago. Chicago has hosted the most major-party presidential nominating conventions of any city (14 Republican, 11 Democrat). The 1968 Democratic National Convention was mired in violence between anti-war demonstrators and the Chicago Police Department. The most recent convention (1996 Democratic National Convention) saw the renomination of Bill Clinton and Al Gore. On May 3, 2022, Chicago launched a website to promote the city as a potential host for the convention. Facilities in Chicago that had been mentioned as potential primary venues include the United Center, Wintrust Arena, and Navy Pier.

On May 14, 2022, Atlanta, Georgia announced its plans to bid. In late-May 2022, New York City, New York announced its bid for the convention. New York City had not previously been expected to bid.

Official bid process
Atlanta, Chicago, Houston, and New York City submitted bids by the May 28, 2022 deadline. In January 2023, DNC officials confirmed that the finalist cities would be Atlanta, Chicago, and New York City, with Houston no longer being considered.

See also 
 2024 United States presidential election
 2024 Democratic Party presidential primaries
 2024 Republican National Convention
 2024 Republican Party presidential primaries

References 

Democratic National Conventions
DNC
2024 conferences